The Illusionist may refer to:

The Illusionist (Johnston novel), a 1995 novel by Jennifer Johnston
The Illusionist (Mason novel), a 1983 novel by Anita Mason
The Illusionist, a translation by Herma Briffault, of Le Rempart des Béguines, by Françoise Mallet-Joris
The Illusionist (1983 film), a Dutch comedy film
The Illusionist (2006 film), an American period film set in Vienna
The Illusionist (2010 film), a French-British animated film
"The Illusionist", a 2006 song by Swedish metal band Scar Symmetry from the album Pitch Black Progress
"The Illusionist", part of "Thus Spoke Zarathustra" by Friedrich Nietzsche
The Illusionists, a touring magic production